"Give That Wolf a Banana" is a song by British-Norwegian pop duo Subwoolfer, released as a single on 10 January 2022. It represented Norway in the Eurovision Song Contest 2022 in Turin, Italy after winning Melodi Grand Prix 2022, Norway's national final. The single reached number four in Norway.

Eurovision Song Contest

Melodi Grand Prix 2022 
About one week after the Eurovision Song Contest 2021, NRK officially opened for songwriters to submit entries for  2022. The submission window was set to close on 15 August 2021, but was later extended to 15 September 2021. The competition was open to all songwriters, and each songwriter could submit up to three songs. Each song should have had at least one Norwegian contributor, in order to "prioritize and promote the Norwegian music scene". In addition to the open submission, NRK also looked for possible entries through targeted search and direct dialogue with the Norwegian music industry. In late November 2021, it was reported that 21 entries had been selected to take part in the contest. Originally, the lineup of participating artists was scheduled to be revealed on 6 January 2022, and their entries at a later time; however, it was later decided they would be announced together on 10 January.

The song would be one of five pre-qualified entrants to be in the final. The final would take place on 19 February 2022. The song would move on to the Gold Final, along with three others. The song would make it into the top two to move on to the Gold Duel. The song would eventually win the Gold Duel, and as a result, represented Norway in the Eurovision Song Contest 2022.

At Eurovision 
According to Eurovision rules, all nations with the exceptions of the host country and the "Big Five" (France, Germany, Italy, Spain and the United Kingdom) are required to qualify from one of two semi-finals in order to compete for the final; the top ten countries from each semi-final progress to the final. The European Broadcasting Union (EBU) split up the competing countries into six different pots based on voting patterns from previous contests, with countries with favourable voting histories put into the same pot. On 25 January 2022, an allocation draw was held which placed each country into one of the two semi-finals, as well as which half of the show they would perform in. Norway was placed into the first semi-final, held on 10 May 2022, and performed in the second half of the show.  After qualifying to the finals held on the 14 May 2022, they performed in spot 7 and went on to achieve 10th place with a total of 182 points.

Valentine's edition
On 11 February 2022, Subwoolfer released a Valentine's Day version of "Give That Wolf a Banana", titled "Give That Wolf a Romantic Banana".

Charts

See also 
 The Fox (What Does the Fox Say?)

References 
2022 singles
2022 songs
Eurovision songs of Norway
Eurovision songs of 2022
Universal Music Group singles